Naeseo-eup is a town or eup located north-west of Changwon City in South Korea. Its districts include Jung-ri, Hogye-ri, Sanggok-ri, Wongye-ri and Samgye-ri, which is considered the downtown area.

The Namhae Expressway Branch 1 goes towards Changwon and Masan. The Gyeongnam-Daero highway leads to the southern end of Masan. This road also follows the river through Naeseo-eup. A path for cyclists and pedestrians follows the river for many kilometers. 

It is an industrial area and the home of Masan University. 

Towns and townships in South Gyeongsang Province
Changwon